Woodfall may refer to:

People
 Henry Sampson Woodfall (1739–1805), English printer and journalist
 His brother William Woodfall (1746–1803), English printer and publisher
 His son George Woodfall (1767–1844), English printer
 George's son Henry Dick Woodfall (1796–1869), English businessman active in Norway

Companies
 Woodfall Film Productions, a British film production company

See also
 Woodfalls, a village in Wiltshire, England